The Ginn Carriage House is a historic carriage house in Winchester, Massachusetts.  The building, which has been converted to a residence, is one of two surviving outbuildings (the other is  the gardener's house) of the extensive "Terrace of Oaks" estate of publisher Edwin Ginn, whose main house was demolished in 1946.  The U-shaped brick carriage house, built in 1900, exhibits high quality construction details, and has touches of Georgian Revival styling.  The original doors to the carriage area are still attached to the building, sheltered by a copper shed roof.

The building was listed on the National Register of Historic Places in 1989.

See also
National Register of Historic Places listings in Winchester, Massachusetts

References

National Register of Historic Places in Winchester, Massachusetts
Carriage houses in the United States
Houses in Winchester, Massachusetts
Carriage houses on the National Register of Historic Places
Transportation buildings and structures on the National Register of Historic Places in Massachusetts